Herman Roosdorp was a Dutch racing driver who lived a long period of his life in Belgium. He was born on 19 April 1895. He started as a house painter before becoming a car dealer. He was the first Dutch man to buy a Ferrari. In Antwerp (Borgerhout) he owned a garage and was dealer for Vanguard. His daughter Anni Roosdorp did also pursue a racing career.

Racing Driver

Herman was a competent racing driver who raced mainly between 1949 and 1954, mostly in Ferraris. During these years, recording a number of good results, including a wins and numerous podiums finishes, with the majority of these at national events. His greatest racing achievement, when partnered by Toni Ulmen, he finished third in the 24 Heures de Spa Francorchamps.
He introduced the Coupe Roosdorp or Roosdorp Cup, that was awarded to the driver of the day during the National races at Zandvoort. A group of journalists chose this driver.

Racing record

Career highlights

Complete 24 Hours of Spa results

Complete 12 Hours of Paris results

References

1895 births
Dutch racing drivers
24 Hours of Spa drivers
World Sportscar Championship drivers
1965 deaths
Dutch expatriate sportspeople in Belgium